The Body Vanished (first shown as The Body Vanishes) is a 1939 British crime comedy film directed by Walter Tennyson and starring Anthony Hulme, C. Denier Warren, and Ernest Sefton. It was made at Isleworth Studios as a quota quickie.

Cast
 Anthony Hulme as Rodney Paine  
 C. Denier Warren as Pip Piper  
 Ernest Sefton as Sgt. Hopkins  
 Evelyn Foster as Miss Casson  
 Frank Atkinson as Hobbleberry  
 Wilfred Noy as Snelling  
 Hamilton Keene as Capt. Haller  
 Cyril Chamberlain as Auctioneer  
 Frederick Keen as Mr. Williams  
 Charles Paton as Mr. Briggs  
 Fred Withers as George Billings

References

Bibliography
 Chibnall, Steve. Quota Quickies: The Birth of the British 'B' Film. British Film Institute, 2007.
 Low, Rachael. Filmmaking in 1930s Britain. George Allen & Unwin, 1985.
 Wood, Linda. British Films, 1927-1939. British Film Institute, 1986.

External links

1939 films
British crime comedy films
1930s crime comedy films
Films directed by Walter Tennyson
Quota quickies
Films set in England
Films shot at Isleworth Studios
British black-and-white films
1930s English-language films
1930s British films